Linganna "Anna" Puttal Pujari (19151999) was a political leader and social worker in Bombay (now Mumbai), India.

References

Activists from Maharashtra
1915 births
1999 deaths
People from Nizamabad, Telangana
Maharashtra municipal councillors
Politicians from Mumbai
Members of the Maharashtra Legislative Council
Marathi politicians